Pulai or Mukim Pulai  is the largest mukim in District of Johor Bahru, State of Johor Darul Ta'zim, Federation of Malaysia.

Name

Mukim Pulai was named after Pulai River. Pulai is a species of tree (sp. Alstonia angustiloba). The tree can be found in abundance at Mount Pulai where Pulai River come from.

Geography

The mukim spans over an area of 520 km2.

Administrative Centre
Pulai host most of Federal and State government and agencies in district Johor Bahru.

 Federal Government's headquarters, Wisma Persekutuan at Jalan Air Molek
 Johor State Administrative Centre, Kota Iskandar
 Former Johor Bahru City Council's headquarter at Jalan Tun Razak
 Former Iskandar Puteri City Council's headquarter at Jalan Skudai
 New Iskandar Puteri City Council's headquarter at Medini
 Johor Official Royal Palace, Istana Serene at Serene Hill
 Johor Official Royal Palace, Istana Besar
 Johor Government Building, Sultan Ibrahim Building at Timbalan Hill
 Johor Islamic Center, Pusat Islam Iskandar at Mahmoodiah Hill

Transportation
The area is easily accessible via CIQ or Senai Airport. It is accessible by Muafakat Bus route P-403. or Causeway Link (5B, 51B) from Johor Bahru Sentral railway station.

See also
 Johor Bahru
 Iskandar Puteri
 Pulai Mutiara, Johor
 Pulai Indah, Johor
 Pulai Hijauan, Johor
 Bandar Baru Kangkar Pulai
 Kangkar Pulai

References

External links
Official Portal of Johor State Government
Website of The Parliament of Malaysia

Mukims of Johor Bahru District